1980 Tezcatlipoca, provisional designation , is an eccentric, stony asteroid and near-Earth object of the Amor group, approximately  in diameter.

It was discovered on 19 June 1950, by American astronomer Albert Wilson and Swedish astronomer Åke Wallenquist at the U.S. Palomar Observatory in California. It was named after the Aztec deity Tezcatlipoca.

Orbit and classification 

Tezcatlipoca orbits the Sun in the inner main-belt at a distance of 1.1–2.3 AU once every 2 years and 3 months (816 days). Its orbit has an eccentricity of 0.36 and an inclination of 27° with respect to the ecliptic.

The body's observation arc begins with its official discovery observation at Palomar.

Physical characteristics
The S-type asteroid is classified as a Sw-type by the ExploreNEOs project, and as a SU and Sl-type on the Tholen and SMASS taxonomic scheme, respectively.

Between 1988 and 2015, five rotational lightcurves of Tezcatlipoca were obtained from photometric observations and gave a well-defined, concurring rotation period of 7.25 hours with a brightness variation between 0.22 and 1.01 in magnitude, indicative of a non-spheroidal shape.

According to the surveys carried out by the Japanese Akari satellite and NASA's Wide-field Infrared Survey Explorer with its subsequent NEOWISE mission, Tezcatlipoca measures between 4.36 and 6.012 kilometers in diameter and its surface has an albedo between 0.128 and 0.26. The Collaborative Asteroid Lightcurve Link agrees with the revised NEOWISE observations, that is, an albedo of 0.128 and a diameter of 6.0 kilometers with an absolute magnitude of 13.96.

Naming
This minor planet was named after Tezcatlipoca, the Aztec deity of matter, whose name translates to "Smoking Mirror" in the Nahuatl language. His animal counterpart was the jaguar and his contender was Quetzálcoatl, after which the minor planet 1915 Quetzálcoatl is named. Both deities are Aztec creator gods and were depicted as twin serpents that coil round each other to produce time. The official  was published by the Minor Planet Center on 15 October 1977.

References

External links
 Asteroid Lightcurve Database (LCDB), query form (info )
 Dictionary of Minor Planet Names, Google books
 Asteroids and comets rotation curves, CdR – Observatoire de Genève, Raoul Behrend
 
 
 

001980
Discoveries by Albert George Wilson
Discoveries by Claes-Ingvar Lagerkvist
Named minor planets
001980
001980
19500619